The war of the languages was a heated debate in Ottoman Palestine over the language of instruction in the country's new Jewish schools. This "language war" was a cornerstone event in the history of the revival of the Hebrew language.

History
In 1913, the German Jewish aid agency , which had maintained schools for Jewish immigrants in Palestine since 1905, sought to establish German as the language of instruction at the first technical high school, the Technikum, in Haifa (later, the Technion), which it was sponsoring. This sparked a public controversy between those who supported the use of German and those who believed that  Hebrew should be the language spoken by the Jewish people in their homeland. The issue was not just ideological, because until then, Hebrew was primarily a liturgical language and lacked modern technical terms.

The Haifa City Museum produced an exhibit on the "War of the Languages" curated by Svetlana Reingold, in 2011.

See also
Languages of Israel
Education in Israel
Culture of Israel

References

External links
 War of the Languages

Jews and Judaism in Ottoman Palestine
Hebrew language
Linguistic controversies

History of the German language